Mount Morris is a steep, sharp mountain about  south of Mount Ostenso, in the main ridge of the Sentinel Range of the Ellsworth Mountains in Antarctica. It surmounts Patton Glacier to the eas-northeast.

The peak was first mapped by the United States Geological Survey from surveys and U.S. Navy air photos from 1957 to 1959, and was named by the Advisory Committee on Antarctic Names for Wesley R. Morris, a meteorologist at Byrd Station in 1957.

See also
 Mountains in Antarctica

Maps
 Vinson Massif.  Scale 1:250 000 topographic map.  Reston, Virginia: US Geological Survey, 1988.
 Antarctic Digital Database (ADD). Scale 1:250000 topographic map of Antarctica. Scientific Committee on Antarctic Research (SCAR). Since 1993, regularly updated.

References

Ellsworth Mountains
Mountains of Ellsworth Land